The Mặt trận Quốc gia Thống nhất (National Unified Front) was a Vietnamese political alliance in the short-lived Empire of Vietnam. It was formed August 14–17, 1945 in Southern Vietnam uniting all non-Viet Minh factions, including Trotskyites and the southern religious sects of Cao Đài and Hòa Hảo. Following the delayed arrival in Saigon on August 22, 1945, of the former president of the Journalists' Syndicate, and now Imperial Commissioner of Nam Bo Nguyen Van Sam, the alliance made an official declaration of national independence and territorial reunification.

The Front initially had its own paramilitary unit, the Advanced Guard Youth, which was under the leader of Dr. Phạm Ngọc Thạch. However Thạch led the unit over to the Viet Minh after the abdication of the Emperor Bảo Đại.

The leading role of the Trotskyite faction was brief and became irrelevant as leaders such as Phan Văn Chánh (d.1945) and Phan Văn Hùm (d.1946) were murdered or disappeared.

References

History of Vietnam